Takhti Metro Station is a station on Isfahan Metro Line 1. The station opened on 2 November 2016. It is located at Takhti intersection in central Isfahan. The next station on the north side is Shohada Station.

References

Isfahan Metro stations
Railway stations opened in 2016